Roger de Montalt, 1st Baron Montalt (1265–1297) (aka Monte Alto) was a baron who rebelled for a time against Henry III of England. Roger was one of the sons of Sir Robert de Monaut, Knight  (born 1230, married 1261, died 1275 in Arden, Cheshire). Robert married Joan Mowbray. Joan (1247–1284) was born in Pontefract, W-Riding, Yorkshire (daughter of Roger Mowbray). Roger was the brother of another Robert de Montalt.

Montalt was one of the defenders of Cambridge for King Henry III. During the reign of Edward I, he served overseas in the Gascon wars. In 1295, he was summoned to Parliament as a baron.

Roger Montalt married Juliana, a daughter of Roger de Clifford, but they had no surviving children.

When Montalt died in 1297, his estates passed to his brother, Robert (1270-1329), and his barony became extinct, but the Montalt barony was recreated in 1299 for this same Robert de Montalt.

References
Burke, Sir Bernard. "Montalt-Barons Montalt." A Genealogical History of the Dormant, Abeyant, Forfeited, and Extinct Peerages, of the British Empire. London: Wm Clowes and Sons, Ltd., 1962. p. 375.

Barons Montalt
1265 births
1297 deaths